Reginald Becton-Buckner (born May 12, 1991) is an American professional basketball player for Earth Friends Tokyo Z of the Japanese professional basketball team. He played college basketball for the University of Mississippi where he starred in his four seasons with the Ole Miss Rebels. Becton is Ole Miss all-time blocked shot leader and as of 2013 ranks fifth in SEC with 326 career blocked shots.

Professional career

Early years (2013–2014)
Following graduating from Ole Miss, Becton was drafted by the Erie BayHawks, Santa Cruz Warriors, and finally playing for the Iowa Energy of the NBA Development League.

Puerto Rico and Mexico (2014–2015)
After the Iowa Energy released him in the 2013–14 season, Becton played in both Puerto Rico and Mexico.

Israel Turkey and Puerto Rico (2015–2019)
On August 31, 2015, Becton signed a deal with Maccabi Haifa of the Israeli Basketball Premier League.

On August 9, 2016, Becton signed with Hapoel Eilat for the 2016–17 season.

On October 28, 2017, Becton returned to Maccabi Haifa for a second stint, signing a one-year deal. In 24 games played during the 2017–18 season, Becton led the Israeli League in blocks (1.5 per game) and also averaged 9.9 points and 5.9 rebounds per game.

On May 31, 2018, Becton joined his former team Cariduros de Fajardo of the Baloncesto Superior Nacional.

2018–19 Season. Becton signed with Mamak Belediye Yeni Mamak Spor of Turkish Basketball First League.

Japan (2019–)
On September 7, 2019, Becton joined Yokohama B-Corsairs of the Japanese professional basketball B1 league.

On October 19, 2022, Becton joined Earth Friends Tokyo Z of the Japanese professional basketball B2 league.

References

External links
Ole Miss Rebels bio

1991 births
Living people
African-American basketball players
American expatriate basketball people in Israel
American expatriate basketball people in Japan
American expatriate basketball people in Mexico
American expatriate basketball people in Turkey
American men's basketball players
Basketball players from Memphis, Tennessee
Capitanes de Arecibo players
Centers (basketball)
Hapoel Eilat basketball players
Iowa Energy players
Maccabi Haifa B.C. players
Maratonistas de Coamo players
Ole Miss Rebels men's basketball players
Power forwards (basketball)
Soles de Mexicali players
Yokohama B-Corsairs players
Earth Friends Tokyo Z players
21st-century African-American sportspeople